Toivo Telen (10 April 1924 – 30 May 2007) was a Finnish shot putter who competed in the 1952 Summer Olympics.

References

1924 births
2007 deaths
Finnish male shot putters
Olympic athletes of Finland
Athletes (track and field) at the 1952 Summer Olympics